Peril may refer to:

 Peril (band), an Australian electronic music group
 USS Peril (AM-272), an Admirable-class minesweeper
 Peril (film), a 2000 film by David Giancola
 Imminent peril, certain danger, immediate, and impending; menacingly close at hand, and threatening
 Peril (book), a 2021 non-fiction book by Bob Woodward and Robert Costa about the end of Donald Trump's presidency and the transition to the Biden administration

See also
 Risk
 Peril Strait